Vorbe grele (in English "Heavy talks") was a TV news talk-show, on the Intact Media Group station Antena 3, hosted by Romanian journalist Victor Ciutacu. The talk-show tackled various economical, political, and social issues that Romania was facing. 

Vorbe grele was aired on Antena 3, Friday, 22:00hours.

External links
n Heavy talks (with Victor Ciutacu) homepage@antena3

See also
Ciutacu article

Romanian television news shows